The Provisional Government of the Democratic Federal Yugoslavia was Democratic Federal Yugoslavia's temporary national government formed through the merger of the Yugoslav government-in-exile and the National Committee for the Liberation of Yugoslavia (NKOJ). It existed from 7 March to 11 November 1945. It then became the Federal People's Republic of Yugoslavia in late 1945, which in turn became the Socialist Federal Republic of Yugoslavia from 1963 to 1992.

History
"At the moment these are our efforts are focused in one direction, and that is:
 to bring together all patriotic and honorable individuals to our fight against the invaders was as successful as possible, 
 build the nations Yugoslav brotherhood and unity that did not exist before the war and for whose absence brought our country to disaster
 provide conditions for the organization of a state in which all the nations feel happy, and it is truly a Democratic Federal Yugoslavia."

Emergence
Before the temporary government was formed, there were several meetings between Tito and Ivan Šubašić, the pre-war Ban of Croatia and Prime Minister of Yugoslavia in London during the Second World War.

The international situation has affected Tito to enter politics and compromise to replace radicalism, the pressure of Great Britain and its international protector USSR, "real politics" and to adopt a memorandum of the British government, which was transmitted to him by Winston Churchill of August 1944. To the country will not impose communism, to keep the Communist Party in the conspiracy, and to express the communist program through the National Front of Yugoslavia.

After the Treaty of Vis or the Tito–Šubašić Agreement, Tito and Šubašić met in Vršac on 20 October 1944. Tito's stay in the Soviet Union during the Moscow Conference between Joseph Stalin and Winston Churchill opened the door for other agreements between representatives of the National Committee and the Royal Government. The agreement was concluded on 1 November 1944 in Belgrade and is known as the Belgrade Agreement.

To new contacts occurred in December 1944, when the amendment was made to the Belgrade Agreement, certain guarantees for the political parties, and the ratification of legislation AVNOJ by the future Constituent Assembly. The Belgrade Agreement has been dissatisfied with King Peter II, whose function under the agreement of Tito–Šubašić in 1944. A Regency Council performed by a panel composed of three members.

However, after the Yalta Conference on 16 February 1945, Ivan Šubašić's government arrived in Belgrade. After much negotiation and persuasion, King Peter II finally agreed to power transition. Under the agreement, three days later, the royal government and the NKOJ resigned.  The new government was formed on 7 March 1945, and on 9 March adopted a Declaration. That night Tito read it in a broadcast over Radio Belgrade.

Abdication of King Peter II
In doing so, the King empowered his Council to form a common temporary government with the National Committee for the Liberation of Yugoslavia (NKOJ) and accept Josip Broz Tito's nomination as Prime Minister of the first normal government of post-war Yugoslavia. As authorized by the King, the Council has thus accepted the Tito's nomination on 29 November 1945, when Federal People's Republic of Yugoslavia or Second Yugoslavia was officially declared. By this unconditional transfer of powers, Peter II has abdicated to Tito. This date, when the second Yugoslavia was born under international law, had since been marked as Yugoslavia's national holiday Day of the Republic, however following the communists' switch to authoritarianism, this holiday officially marked the 1943 Session of AVNOJ that coincidentally fell on the same day of the year.

Milan Grol the Deputy Prime Minister resigned on 8 August 1945, on the grounds that the new government did not respect the principle of democracy and freedom of speech. After the "burning house" editorial of Democracy was published in the towns of Yugoslavia, there was a disagreement between Šubašić and a representative of the Unitary National Liberation Front. On the same day, Juraj Šutej, Minister without portfolio, resigned. Ivan Šubašić, the Minister of Foreign Affairs, resigned on 8 October 1945, saying there was no free democratic government but a communist dictatorship in the country.

Members of the cabinet

Notes

References

1945 establishments in Yugoslavia
1945 disestablishments in Yugoslavia
Government of Yugoslavia
Provisional governments

sh:Privremena vlada Demokratske Federativne Jugoslavije